Bheki Mathews Hadebe is a South African politician from the Western Cape who has been a Member of the National Assembly of South Africa since 2019. Hadebe is a member of the African National Congress.

Parliamentarian (2019–present)
Hadebe was ranked 6th on the ANC's list of Western Cape parliamentary candidates for the general election on 8 May 2019. After the election, he was announced as an incoming Member of the National Assembly. He was sworn into office on 22 May 2019.

In parliament, Hadebe is a member of the  Standing Committee on Public Accounts (SCOPA) and the Portfolio Committee on Cooperative Governance and Traditional Affairs. He was appointed to both committees in June 2019.

References

External links
Mr Bheki Mathews Hadebe at Parliament of South Africa

Living people
Year of birth missing (living people)
Xhosa people
Members of the National Assembly of South Africa
African National Congress politicians